USS Nereus may refer to the following ships of the United States Navy:

 , an American Civil War steamer
 , a  collier
 , a  submarine tender

United States Navy ship names